Aderbal Freire Filho (born May 8, 1941) is a Brazilian actor, theatrical director and television presenter.

Personal life 
Aderbal Freire Filho was born in Fortaleza, Ceará. He graduated in law. Since 2004, he has established a stable relationship with actress Marieta Severo.

Filmography

Television 
{| class="wikitable"
!Year
!Title 
!Role 
!TV channel 
|-
|1994
|Confissões de Adolescente
|Professor Erculano (Ep. O Que Eu Vou Ser Quando Crescer)
|TV Cultura
|-
|2014
|Dupla Identidade
|Senator Otto Veiga|Rede Globo
|-
|2015
|Tapas & Beijos
|Norberto (Special participation)|Rede Globo
|}

 Theater 

1972 - O Cordão Umbilical, de Mario Prata. 
1973 - Apareceu a Margarida, de Roberto Athayde.
1974 - Um Visitante do Alto, de Roberto Athayde.
1974 - Manual de Sobrevivência na Selva, de Roberto Athayde. 
1974 - Pequeno Dicionário da Língua Feminina, de Flávio Márcio.
1974 - Reveillon, de Flávio Márcio. 
1975 - Corpo a Corpo, Corpo a Corpo, de Oduvaldo Vianna Filho.
1975 - O Vôo dos Pássaros Selvagens, de Aldomar Conrado. 
1977 - A Morte de Danton, de Georg Büchner. 
1978 - Em Algum Lugar Fora Deste Mundo, de José Wilker.
1979 - Crimes Delicados, de José Antônio de Souza (em Buenos Aires).
1980 - O Desembestado, de Ariovaldo Mattos.
1980 - Dom Quixote de la Pança, adaptação da novela de Cervantes.
1981 - Moço em Estado de Sítio, de Oduvaldo Vianna Filho.
1983 - Besame Mucho, de Mario Prata. 
1984 - Mão na Luva, de Oduvaldo Vianna Filho.
1985 - Mefisto, de Klaus Mann (em Montevidéu, com o elenco oficial da Comédia Nacional de Uruguai).
1987 - Egor Bulichov y otros, de Máximo Gorki (com El Galpón, de Montevidéu).
1988 - Simon Boccanera, de Giuseppe Verdi (em Montevidéu).
1989 - Soroco, Sua Mãe, Sua Filha, adaptado de Guimarães Rosa (in the Netherlands, with the Teatro Munganga of Amsterdam).
1990 - A Mulher Carioca aos 22 Anos.
1991 - Lampião, de Aderbal Freire Filho.
1991 - O Tiro Que Mudou a História, de Aderbal Freire Filho e Carlos Eduardo Novaes.
1992 - Tiradentes, Inconfidência no Rio, de Aderbal Freire Filho e Carlos Eduardo Novaes. 
1994 - Senhora dos Afogados, de Nelson Rodrigues.
1995 - Lima Barreto, ao Terceiro Dia, de Luis Alberto de Abreu.
1995 - Kean, adaptação de Jean-Paul Sartre da obra de Alexandre Dumas.
1996 - No Verão de 1996, a partir dos quadros de Rubens Gerchman.
1997 - O Carteiro e O Poeta, de Antonio Skármeta.
1999 - Luces de Bohemia, de Ramón del Valle Inclán (com El Galpón, de Montevidéu).
2001 - Casa de Bonecas, de Henrik Ibsen. 
2002 - Sylvia, adaptação de Flávio Marinho para o texto de A. Gurney.
2002 - A Prova, de David Auburn. 
2003 - Cão Coisa e a Coisa Homem, de Aderbal Freire Filho. 
2003 - Tio Vânia, de Anton Chekhov.
2003 - A Peça sobre o Bebê, de Edward Albee.
2003 - O que diz Molero, de Dinis Machado.
2005 - Sonata de Outono, versão para teatro de Ingmar Bergman.
2006 - O Púcaro Búlgaro, baseado em textos de Campos de Carvalho.
2007 - O Continente Negro, de Marco Antônio De La Parra.
2007 - As Centernárias, de Newton Moreno.
2008 - A Ordem do Mundo, de Patrícia Melo.
2008 - Hamlet, de William Shakespeare.
2009 - Moby Dick, adaptação do romance de Herman Melville.
2010 - Macbeth, de William Shakespeare.
2010 - Orfeu, de Vinicius de Moraes.
2011 - Linda, de Gillray Coutinho.
2011 - Na selva das cidades, de Bertolt Brecht.
2011 - Depois do Filme, de Aderbal Freire Filho.

 Cinema 
2008 - Juventude, by Domingos de Oliveira.
2012 - Paixão e Acaso'', by Domingos de Oliveira.

References

External links

 Biography
 Moby Dick

1941 births
Living people
People from Fortaleza
Brazilian theatre directors
Brazilian male television actors
Brazilian television presenters